Charles William Mark Burch  (1919-2001), was an England international lawn bowler.

Bowls career
Burch became the English National champion in 1978 when he defeated the legendary David Bryant during the 1978 National Championship singles final. He subsequently won the singles at the British Isles Bowls Championships in 1979.

He represented England in the fours event, at the 1978 Commonwealth Games in Edmonton, Alberta, Canada.

References

1919 births
2001 deaths
English male bowls players
Bowls players at the 1978 Commonwealth Games
Commonwealth Games competitors for England